Liezel Huber and Lisa Raymond were the defending champions but lost to Nadia Petrova and Katarina Srebotnik in the semifinals 6–4, 6–4.
Klaudia Jans-Ignacik and Kristina Mladenovic won the title by defeating Nadia Petrova and Katarina Srebotnik 7–5, 2–6, [10–7] in the final.

Seeds
The top four seeds receive a bye into the second round.

Draw

Finals

Top half

Bottom half

References
General

Specific

2012 WTA Tour
Women's Doubles
2012 in Canadian women's sports